The Malian women's national under-16 and under-17 basketball team is a national basketball team of Mali and is governed by the Fédération Malienne de Basketball. 
It represents the country in international under-16 and under-17 (under age 16 and under age 17) women's basketball competitions.

World Cup results

See also
Mali women's national basketball team
Mali women's national under-19 basketball team
Mali men's national under-17 basketball team

References

under
Women's national under-17 basketball teams